Dongguan Stadium (Simplified Chinese: 东莞体育场) is a multi-purpose stadium in Dongguan, Guangdong, China.  It is currently used mostly for football matches.  The stadium holds 22,000 people. The stadium was built in 1994.

Footnotes

Football venues in China
Multi-purpose stadiums in China
Sports venues in Guangdong